The Isuzu Cubic (kana:いすゞ・キュービック) was a heavy-duty single-decker bus built by Isuzu between 1984 and 2000. The various models of the vehicle were primarily available as a city bus configuration, either a complete bus or a bus chassis.

Models 
The Two-step and One-step versions were considered as step-entrance buses, whereas the Non-step version was considered as low-floor buses.

Two-Step
P-LV214/218/314/318 (1984)
U-LV218/224/318/324 (1990)
KC-LV280/380/880 (1995)
NE-LV288(CNG, 1995)

One-Step
U-LV870L (1992)
KC-LV880L (1995)
Non-Step
KC-LV832 (1998)

Model lineup 
One-Step
Two-Step
Non-Step
CHASSE (Hybrid bus)

See also 

 List of buses

External links 

 Trans' Bus.org BERLIET / RENAULT PR 100, The style of origin. ( French language )

Cubic
Low-floor buses
Step-entrance buses
Buses of Japan
Bus chassis
Hybrid electric buses
Full-size buses
Vehicles introduced in 1984